Echiniscus is a genus of tardigrades in the family Echiniscidae. The genus was named and described by Karl August Sigismund Schultze in 1840.

Species

The genus includes the following species: 

 Echiniscus africanus Murray, 1907
 Echiniscus aliquantillus Grigarick, Schuster & Nelson, 1983
 Echiniscus angolensis da Cunha & do Nascimento Ribeiro, 1964
 Echiniscus apuanus Bertolani, 1946
 Echiniscus arcangelii Maucci, 1973–74
 Echiniscus arctomys Ehrenberg, 1853
 Echiniscus arthuri Pilato, Binda & Lisi, 2005
 Echiniscus azoricus Fontoura, Pilato & Lisi, 2008 
 Echiniscus baius Marcus, 1928
 Echiniscus baloghi Iharos, 1973
 Echiniscus barbarae Kaczmarek & Michalczyk, 2002
 Echiniscus batramiae Iharos, 1936
 Echiniscus becki Schuster & Grigarick, 1966
 Echiniscus bigranulatus Richters, 1907
 Echiniscus bisculptus Maucci, 1983
 Echiniscus blumi Richters, 1903
 Echiniscus calcaratus Richters, 1908
 Echiniscus calvus Marcus, 1931
 Echiniscus canadensis Murray, 1910 
 Echiniscus canedoi da Cunha & do Nascimento Ribeiro, 1962
 Echiniscus capillatus Ramazzotti, 1956
 Echiniscus carsicus Mihelčič, 1966
 Echiniscus carusoi Pilato, 1972
 Echiniscus cavagnaroi Schuster & Grigarick, 1966
 Echiniscus cervicornis Murray, 1906
 Echiniscus charrua Claps & Rossi, 1997
 Echiniscus cheonyoungi Moon & Kim, 1994
 Echiniscus cirinoi Binda & Pilato, 1993
 Echiniscus clavispinosus Fontoura, Pilato & Lisi, 2011 
 Echiniscus clevelandi Beasley, 1999
 Echiniscus columinis Murray, 1911
 Echiniscus corrugicaudatus McInnes, 2009
 Echiniscus crassispinosus Murray, 1907
 Echiniscus crebraclava Sun, Li & Feng, 2014
 Echiniscus curiosus Claxton, 1996
 Echiniscus danieli Meyer, Tsaliki & Sorgee, 2017
 Echiniscus dariae Kaczmarek & Michalczyk, 2010
 Echiniscus darienae Miller, Horning & Dastych, 1995
 Echiniscus dearmatus Bartoš, 1935
 Echiniscus dikenli Maucci, 1973
 Echiniscus diploglyptus Durante Pasa & Maucci, 1975
 Echiniscus divergens Marcus, 1936
 Echiniscus dreyfusi de Barros, 1942
 Echiniscus duboisi Richters, 1902
 Echiniscus egnatiae Durante Pasa & Maucci, 1979
 Echiniscus ehrenbergi Dastych & Kristensen, 1995
 Echiniscus elaeinae Pilato, Binda & Lisi, 2005
 Echiniscus elegans Richters, 1907
 Echiniscus evelinae de Barros, 1942
 Echiniscus ganczareki Michalczyk & Kaczmarek, 2007
 Echiniscus granulatus (Doyère, 1840)
 Echiniscus heterospinosus Maucci, 1954
 Echiniscus hexacanthus Maucci, 1973
 Echiniscus hoonsooi Moon & Kim, 1990
 Echiniscus horningi Schuster & Grigarick, 1971
 Echiniscus inocelatus Mihelčič, 1938
 Echiniscus insuetus Mihelčič, 1967
 Echiniscus jagodici Mihelčič, 1951
 Echiniscus jamesi Claxton, 1996
 Echiniscus japonicus Morikawa, 1951
 Echiniscus jenningsi Dastych, 1984
 Echiniscus kerguelensis Richters, 1904
 Echiniscus knowltoni Schuster & Grigarick, 1971
 Echiniscus kofordi Schuster & Grigarick, 1966
 Echiniscus kosickii Kaczmarek & Michalczyk, 2010
 Echiniscus lapponicus Thulin, 1911
 Echiniscus laterosetosus Ito, 1993
 Echiniscus laterospinosus Rudescu, 1964
 Echiniscus latifasciatus Dudichev & Biserov, 2000
 Echiniscus lentiferus Claxton & Dastych, 2017
 Echiniscus lichenorum Maucci, 1983
 Echiniscus limai da Cunha & do Nascimento Ribeiro, 1964
 Echiniscus lineatus Pilato, Fontoura, Lisi & Beasley, 2008
 Echiniscus longispinosus Murray, 1907
 Echiniscus loxophthalmus Richters, 1911
 Echiniscus madonnae Michalczyk & Kaczmarek, 2006
 Echiniscus maesi Séméria, 1985
 Echiniscus malpighii Biserov, 1994
 Echiniscus manuelae da Cunha & do Nascimento Ribeiro, 1962
 Echiniscus marcusi Pilato, Claxton & Binda, 1989
 Echiniscus marginatus Binda & Pilato, 1994
 Echiniscus marginoporus Grigarick, Schuster & Nelson, 1983
 Echiniscus markezi Mihelčič, 1971/72
 Echiniscus marleyi Li, 2007
 Echiniscus masculinus Gąsiorek, Vončina & Michalczyk, 2020
 Echiniscus mauccii Ramazzotti, 1956
 Echiniscus mediantus Marcus, 1930
 Echiniscus merokensis Richters, 1904
 Echiniscus migiurtinus Franceschi, 1957
 Echiniscus mihelcici Iharos, 1973
 Echiniscus militaris Murray, 1911
 Echiniscus molluscorum Fox & Garcia-Moll, 1962
 Echiniscus mongoliensis Iharos, 1973
 Echiniscus moniliatus Iharos, 1967
 Echiniscus montanus Iharos, 1982
 Echiniscus mosaicus Grigarick, Schuster & Nelson, 1983
 Echiniscus murrayi Iharos, 1969
 Echiniscus nelsonae Li, Wang & Yu, 2007
 Echiniscus nepalensis Dastych, 1975
 Echiniscus nigripustulus Horning, Schuster & Grigarick, 1978
 Echiniscus nobilis Mihelčič, 1967
 Echiniscus ollantaytamboensis Nickel, Miller & Marley, 2001
 Echiniscus osellai Maucci, 1975
 Echiniscus pajstunensis Bartoš,1941
 Echiniscus palmai Dastych, 1997
 Echiniscus pardalis Degma & Schill, 2015
 Echiniscus perarmatus Murray, 1907
 Echiniscus peruvianus Binda & Pilato, 1994
 Echiniscus perviridis Ramazzotti, 1959
 Echiniscus phocae du Bois-Reymond Marcus, 1944
 Echiniscus polygonalis Ito, 1993
 Echiniscus pooensis Rodriguez-Roda, 1948
 Echiniscus porabrus Horning, Schuster & Grigarick, 1978
 Echiniscus postojnensis Mihelčič, 1967
 Echiniscus pseudelegans Séméria, 1994
 Echiniscus pseudowendti Dastych, 1984
 Echiniscus punctus McInnes, 1995
 Echiniscus pusae Marcus, 1928
 Echiniscus quadrispinosus Richters, 1902
 Echiniscus quitensis Pilato, 2007
 Echiniscus rackae Dastych, 1986
 Echiniscus ranzii Ramazzotti, 1964
 Echiniscus reticulatus Murray, 1905
 Echiniscus reymondi Marcus, 1928
 Echiniscus robertsi Schuster & Grigarick, 1965
 Echiniscus rodnae Claxton, 1996
 Echiniscus rufoviridis du Bois-Reymond Marcus, 1944
 Echiniscus rugospinosus Marcus, 1928
 Echiniscus scabrospinosus Fontoura, 1982
 Echiniscus semifoveolatus Ito, 1993
 Echiniscus shaanxiensis Li, Wang & Yu, 2007
 Echiniscus siegristi Heinis, 1911
 Echiniscus simba Marcus, 1928
 Echiniscus speciosus Mihelčič, 1967
 Echiniscus spiculifer Schaudinn, 1901
 Echiniscus spiniger Richters, 1904
 Echiniscus spinulosus (Doyère, 1840)
 Echiniscus storkani Bartoš, 1940
 Echiniscus sylvanus Murray, 1910
 Echiniscus taibaiensis Wang & Li, 2005
 Echiniscus tamus Mehlen, 1969
 Echiniscus tardus Mihelčič, 1951
 Echiniscus tenuis Marcus, 1928
 Echiniscus tessellatus Murray, 1910
 Echiniscus testudo (Doyère, 1840)
 Echiniscus trisetosus Cuénot, 1932
 Echiniscus trojanus Maucci, 1973
 Echiniscus tropicalis Binda & Pilato, 1995
 Echiniscus tympanista Murray, 1911
 Echiniscus velaminis Murray, 1910
 Echiniscus vinculus Horning, Schuster & Grigarick, 1978
 Echiniscus virginicus Riggin, 1962
 Echiniscus viridianus Pilato, Fontoura & Lisi, 2007
 Echiniscus viridis Murray, 1910
 Echiniscus viridissimus Péterfi, 1956
 Echiniscus walteri Pilato & Lisi, 2003
 Echiniscus weisseri Maucci, 1978
 Echiniscus wendti Richters, 1903
 Echiniscus zetotrymus Horning, Schuster & Grigarick, 1978

Species brought into synonymy
Echiniscus intermedius Murray, 1910: synonym of Bryochoerus intermedius Marcus, 1936

References

Further reading

Schultze,  Echiniscus bellermanni. Animal Crustaceum (1840), Berlin, p. 1-8.
Nomenclator Zoologicus info

 
Tardigrade genera